Robert "Robbie" Countryman (born in Los Angeles, California) is an American television director.

He began his career as a stage manager on the sitcom Growing Pains. His other stage managing credits include Martin, Hangin' with Mr. Cooper and So Little Time. While working on Mr. Cooper, he also became an assistant director, working on the series Suddenly Susan. As well as Women's Murder Club, The Unit, Brothers and Melissa & Joey.

In 2004, he made his head directorial debut on Reba. His other directing credits include Just Jordan, Surviving Suburbia, The Wannabes, Wizards of Waverly Place, Pair of Kings, Let's Stay Together and Reed Between the Lines.

Countryman is a graduate of University of Southern California with a bachelor's degree in Science.

Filmography

References

External links

African-American television directors
American television directors
Living people
People from Los Angeles
University of Southern California alumni
Year of birth missing (living people)
21st-century African-American people